The 1991 Barber Saab Pro Series season was the fifth season of the series. This was the first season the class had a title sponsor, Zerex. All drivers used Saab powered Goodyear shod Mondiale chassis. Bryan Herta won the championship.

Race calendar and results

Final standings

References

Barber Dodge Pro Series
1991 in American motorsport